Simon Atkinson is a British architect, currently the Mike Hogg Centennial Professor in Community and Regional Planning at University of Texas at Austin and Fellow of the Royal Society of Arts.

References

Year of birth missing (living people)
Living people
University of Texas at Austin faculty
21st-century British architects